The term "opaline" refers to a number of different styles of glassware.

By opaline glass we mean a milky glass, which can be white or colored, and is made translucent or opaque by adding particular phosphates or oxides during the mixing. It can also have iris reflexes.

In France, the term "opaline" is used to refer to multiple types of glass, and not specifically antique colored crystal or semi-crystal, as is commonly thought, with 'opaline' often a mistakenly-given term referring to the color of a particular type of glass, rather than the age, origin or content of the glass.

Description
To make the opaline glass, opacifying substances are added, such as: sodium phosphate, sodium chloride, calcium phosphate, calcium chloride, tin oxide and talc oxide. The glass can thus take on different colors and have varying shades of color, depending on the quantity of the added substance: from white to gray, to pink, to lavender green, to golden yellow, to light blue, up to blue and black.

History
The first objects in opaline glass were made in Murano in the sixteenth century, with the addition of calcium phosphate, resulting from the calcination of the bones. The technique did not remain secret and was copied in Germany, where this glass was known as bein glass. Opaline glass was produced in large quantities in France in the nineteenth century and reached the apex of diffusion and popularity during the empire of Napoleon III; but the pieces made in the period of Napoleon I, which are translucent, are the most sought after by the antiques market.

The production centers were in Le Creusot, in Baccarat, in Saint-Louis-lès-Bitche. In England it was produced in the eighteenth century, in Bristol. From the mid-nineteenth century opaque opal glass objects came into fashion. At the Sèvres Porcelain Manufactory, a production line in white milk glass, decorated by hand, was experimented with, which attempted to imitate the transparency of Chinese porcelain.

With this particular glass objects of common use were handcrafted: vases, bowls, cups, goblets, carafes, perfume bottles, boxes, lamps. Some objects were also decorated in cold enamel, with flowers, with landscapes, with birds. Sometimes a bronze or silver support was added to the opal vase. 

Most green or yellow opaline glass are uranium glass.

19th century opaline glass
Many different pieces were produced in opaline glass, including vases, bowls, cups, coupes, decanters, perfume bottles, boxes, clocks and other implements.

All opaline glass is hand-blown and has a rough or polished pontil on the bottom. There are no seams and no machine engraving, and most opaline glass is not branded or signed. Many pieces of opaline glass are decorated with gilding. Some with handpainted flowers or birds. Several have bronze ormolu mounts, rims, hinges or holders.

Later opaline glass
The French factory Portieux Vallérysthal in 1930 has put opal glass objects on the market in a particular blue-azure color. Some pieces have decorations in pure gold or polychrome enamels and are sometimes equipped with supports or hinges in gilded bronze (sets of plates, cruets, sets of glasses and cups, boxes, lamps, flacons, chandeliers). The blue-blue color of the glass is inspired by that of the American robin's egg.
In the late 20th century the venetian master glassmaker Vincenzo Nason, began producing a similar type of glass, labelled 'Veritable Opaline de Murano'.

Further reading
  
  
  

Glass art
Glass compositions
Spoken articles